Pixel Chix was a handheld life simulation game aimed at young children. The game was set on an LCD screen in a plastic dollhouse and centered around interacting with a digital girl and doing activities with her. Activities included feeding her, playing games, dressing her up, going out, sending her to bed and more. As you played, you would unlock new items and activities. Other games in the series released featured the "Roomies" which brought 6 characters together in a 3-story apartment complex, a babysitting simulator, and a pet simulator called "The Secret Life of Pets," which featured a hamster or dog, and was in no way similar to the 2016 movie from Universal Pictures. They are similar to Tamagotchi in that they have a LCD screen and control buttons, although they are larger. They were first released in 2005 by Mattel, forming an important part of their earnings that year.

Each house includes a lounge, kitchen and dining area, and steps leading upstairs. The first line of houses includes a cottage, mansion and loft, and a different girl inhabits each. The 2-Story House variant allows you to view and access the second story, and only includes a cottage and loft. Each house also comes in different colors including blue, pink and yellow. A unique purple loft was released only in Europe. Fitted at the bottom sides of every house are USB-like plug-ins that connect the houses together that allows different Pixel Chix to visit and interact with each other.

In 2009, Mattel discontinued the brand, however, Pixel Chix remained on the Everythinggirl.com website until the website shut down in 2015.

The Pixel Chix girls are all voiced by Tara Strong, except Miss Sporty who is voiced by Katherine Von Till.

Premise
In the game, two or more houses can be connected, allowing the characters (the Pixel Chix) to visit one another. These characters can be controlled in ways similar to other hand-held games, such as Tamagotchi. They can be told to go for a walk, watch television, eat a variety of foods, such as popcorn and hamburgers, and go to sleep.

The more they are played with, the more options appear to the player; higher levels introduce different types of food, more outfits and more games to play. However; if they are ignored, they will decrease in skill level. Eventually, if ignored for too long, the game will "end" by causing the characters to "leave", although they can come back by resetting the game using a mini screwdriver into a reset hole.

The story is based and shown on the Internet of women living in an all-female college and fashionable poses, beginning with a house, then mate's connection and following with cars and babysitting.

Variations and accessories

A number of Pixel Chix accessories have been created including the "Road Trippin' Cars" where one can go to the mall, go to the beach, or do many other things. The cars come in multiple colors. There are also metallic Road Trippin' Cars and a glitter house that were only released in Europe.

Also available is the Pixel Chix Love 2 Shop mall, where the Pixel Chix can work, shop, play games, and take breaks. There are two different malls, a boutique/food court, and a pet shop/salon. Each mall has an LCD flip screen, allowing the Pixel Chix girl to change stores. They are able to connect to the houses, cars, and other malls.

Another available accessory is the Pixel Chix two-story house. It is almost the exact replica of the original Pixel Chix except that it has an upstairs bedroom. There, the Pixel Chix can put on makeup at the vanity, go to the bathroom, and much more. They come in dark and light pink and are connectable to the cars, malls, and other houses. Here, no matter how long she is neglected, the Pixel Chix girl remains happy in the player's house with the player's level skills kept the same.

There is also Pixel Pets (Secret Life of Pets) in which pets can start becoming disco stars, the animal equivalent of Pixel Chix. Dogs and hamsters are available.

Also available is a babysitter house where the Pixel Chix looks after a baby girl. The red light flashes if something is wrong or needs attention.

There is the "Roomies" House with three floors (six rooms in all) with five different roommates - Diva Queen, DJ Hip Hop, Punk Rocker, Super Smarty and Miss Sporty - who are all sold separately, except for Miss Sporty, who comes with the Roomies house.

There is a Pixel Chix TV, which comes with a remote control to switch channels and also unlock channels.

The last Pixel Chix product to be released was the "Fab Life City" where the Pixel Chix girl can go to the bank, mall and amusement park. There is also a piggy bank which can hold coins.

McDonald's Happy Meal toys based on the line were released in 2008 in several countries, including Portugal, France, Australia and New Zealand.

Specification

The toys have an LCD screen display of various sizes, and are powered by four AAA alkaline batteries, while the cars use only 3 AAA batteries.

Since they were distributed in several countries, the voices of the characters were translated depending on where they were sold, being printed on the motherboard what language is programmed onto the ROM of the machine.

Website 
There was an official website of Pixel Chix on Everythinggirl.com. There were games, such as "Monster Baby" and four mini-games which could be unlocked, videos of TV commercials, T-shirt graphics, a downloadable desktop buddy, as well as secret codes and a movie maker similar to that of Zimmer Twins. The website closed in 2014 along with the My Scene website.

References

External links
 

Mattel games
Handheld electronic games
2000s toys